Mika Tyyskä (born November 5, 1976), better known by his stage name Mr. Fastfinger, is a Finnish virtuoso guitarist, and multi-instrumentalist who encompasses several genres of music. Originally, Mr. Fastfinger was an imaginary character, created and animated in Flash, to be "host" of the website GuitarShredShow.com, an award-winning combination of further animation and an online guitar school. The online guitar school opened 2005. The better the website was known, the more Mika Tyyskä was asked to share and to teach in clinics and guitar camps in Europe and Japan.

Mr. Fastfinger's debut album The Way of the Exploding Guitar was released in 2009. Guests appearances on the album include Jordan Rudess (Dream Theater), Mattias Eklundh (Freak Kitchen), Christophe Godin (Mörglbl), and Niko Tsonev. Mr. Fastfinger's second album In Motion was released in 2012, featuring such guests as Thomas Blug, Timo Kämäräinen and Jordan Rudess.

In 2012, Mika Tyyskä joined the high class of guitar players on JamTrackCentral.com. Mika is featured alongside some of the most respected and successful guitarists in the world – Guthrie Govan, Andy James, Marco Sfogli and more.

In 2013, Mr. Fastfinger released a mini-album Stringweaver – which is also an extended soundtrack to a Mr. Fastfinger level of the online game GuitarBots.com.

In 2015, to celebrate Mr. Fastfinger's 10 years of existence, Mika Tyyskä released a 30 minutes long movie. The Spirit of the Guitar Hunt. The movie is a collaboration between Mika Tyyskä and custom guitar maker Juha Ruokangas  Also Mr. Fastfinger's 4th release Spirit Rising was released. Album is a soundtrack to the movie and features many guest appearances from musicians such as Jordan Rudess (Dream Theater), Michael Angelo Batio, Kai Hahto (Nightwish, Wintersun), Jan-Olof Strandberg, Kristoffer Gildenlöw (ex Pain of Salvation), Kalle Katz and more.

In 2016 Two EP's were released. “Neon Alchemist” is an EP with 4 new tracks inspired by Mika’s recent trips to Asia and US. A live EP “Swim Like Sushi” with 6 tracks was also released. Live recording reveals many of Mr. Fastfinger’s stronger tracks in a totally new light. Two EP’s plus “Stringweaver” EP from 2013 was put together for a CD release.

In 2017 Mika did workshops in Europe as well as worked on new music and instructional material. First piece of music was released with artist name Mika Tyyskä. Jam Track Central's Guitar Hero Ballads II  compilation album features tune Mika's tune "Pulse".

Along the years, Mika Tyyskä has also brought Mr. Fastfinger to live gigs. Shows are performed with video backing tracks, sometimes with trio. Sometimes it's just Mika with the video tracks. The musicians in Mr. Fastfinger's trio are: Mika Tyyskä (guitar), Thomas Törnroos (drums), Lasse Rantanen (bass).

Band
Mika Tyyskä – guitar
Lasse Rantanen – bass
Thomas Törnroos – drums and percussions

Discography

Mr. Fastfinger
The Way of the Exploding Guitar (Elektrik Pyjamas 2009)
in Motion (Elektrik Pyjamas 2012)
Stringweaver -EP (Elektrik Pyjamas 2013)
Spirit Rising (Elektrik Pyjamas 2015)
Swim Like Sushi (live) -EP (Elektrik Pyjamas 2016)
Neon Alchemist -EP (Elektrik Pyjamas 2016)
Mountain Tone (2019)

Mountain Tone 2 (2020)

Flight Mode (2022)
Tremors (March 2023)

Guest appearances 

 Pepe Deluxé – Phantom Cabinet Vol. 1 (Catskills Records, 2021)
 Hevisaurus – Mikä minusta tulee isona? (Sony Music Finland 2018)
 Guitar Addiction  –  Guitar Addiction 2 (Guitar Euro Media 2015)
 Pepe Deluxé – Queen of the Wave (Catskills Records 2012)
Sauruxet – Saurusplaneetta (Leka Productions 2011)
Guitar Addiction – a Tribut to Modern Guitar (Guitar Euro Media 2011)
Timo Kämäräinen – Pulpae (Texicalli Records, 2010)
Niko Tsonev – Black Feather (Stunted records, 2008)
Pepe Deluxé – Spare Time Machine (Catskills records, 2007)

Compilations
 Guitar Hero Ballads 2 (JTC Records 2017)
Melodic Soloists (Mad Guitar Records 2010)

Gear and endorsements
Ruokangas Guitars (guitars)
Hughes & Kettner: Tubemeister, Grandmeister, Triamp and Switchblade (amplifiers)
D'Addario (strings)
Guitar Pro 6 (software)

References

1976 births
Finnish male musicians
Finnish rock musicians
Living people